The women's 100 metres at the 1958 European Athletics Championships was held in Stockholm, Sweden, at Stockholms Olympiastadion on 20 and 21 August 1958.

Medalists

Results

Final
21 August
Wind: -1.0 m/s

Semi-finals
21 August

Semi-final 1
Wind: 1.7 m/s

Semi-final 2
Wind: 1 m/s

Semi-final 3
Wind: 1 m/s

Heats
20 August

Heat 1

Heat 2

Heat 3

Heat 4

Heat 5

Heat 6

Participation
According to an unofficial count, 27 athletes from 15 countries participated in the event.

 (1)
 (1)
 (1)
 (2)
 (1)
 (2)
 (3)
 (1)
 (3)
 (3)
 (1)
 (2)
 (3)
 (2)
 (1)

References

100 metres
100 metres at the European Athletics Championships
Euro